Two Altos is an album by American alto saxophonists Art Pepper and Sonny Red. The four standards which appear on the album were recorded in Los Angeles with West Coast-jazz musicians between 1952 and 1954, whilst the two originals were recorded at Van Gelder Studio, in 1957. Regent Records, a subsidiary of Savoy,  released these recordings in 1959.

Track listing
"Deep Purple" (Robbins, Parish) - 3:58
"Watkins Production" (Doug Watkins) - 9:36
"Everything Happens to Me" (Dennis, Adair) - 3:08
"Redd's Head" (Sonny Red) - 9:13
"These Foolish Things" (Maschwitz, Link, Strachey) - 2:41
"What's New" (Haggart, Burke) - 3:25

Personnel
Tracks 1, 6
Art Pepper - alto saxophone
Jack Montrose - tenor saxophone
Claude Williamson - piano
Monty Budwig - bass
Larry Bunker - drums

Tracks 2, 4
Sonny Red - alto saxophone
Pepper Adams - baritone saxophone
Wynton Kelly - piano
Doug Watkins - bass
Elvin Jones - drums

Track 3
Art Pepper - alto saxophone
Russ Freeman - piano
Bob Whitlock - bass
Bobby White - drums

Track 5
Art Pepper - alto saxophone
Hampton Hawes - piano
Joe Mondragon - bass
Larry Bunker - drums

References

1959 albums
Savoy Records albums
Art Pepper albums
Sonny Red albums
Albums recorded at Van Gelder Studio